Paul Costa (born 4 May 1971) is an Australian freestyle skier. He competed in the men's moguls event at the 1994 Winter Olympics.

References

1971 births
Living people
Australian male freestyle skiers
Olympic freestyle skiers of Australia
Freestyle skiers at the 1994 Winter Olympics
People from Mount Beauty, Victoria